Shologonsky Ethnic Rural Okrug or Shologonsky Nasleg is an administrative division of Olenyoksky District of the Sakha Republic, Russia. As a municipal division, its territory is incorporated as Shologonsky Ethnic Rural Settlement within Olenyoksky Municipal District.

Geography
It is located on the Markha River downstream of Udachny. Its administrative center and the only inhabited locality is Eyik.

Climate
The rural okrug has an extreme subarctic climate (Köppen climate classification Dfd). Precipitation is moderate, and is significantly higher in summer than at other times of the year.

References

Sakha Republic